Presbyterian Church in Singapore and Malaysia was a Christian denomination in Malaysia and Singapore.

It was founded in 1881 and had its first synod in 1901. It was known as the Singapore and Malaysia Synod of the Church of Christ in China until 1968, when it changed its name to the Presbyterian Church in Singapore and Malaysia. It held its final synod in 1974, and in 1975 the Presbyterian Church in Singapore and the Presbyterian Church in Malaysia were formed.

References

Religious organizations established in 1881
Religious organizations disestablished in 1975
Presbyterian denominations in Asia
1881 establishments in the British Empire